Jerry Haleva (born ) is an American actor and political lobbyist. He gained fame as an actor as a doppelgänger of Saddam Hussein due to his physical resemblance to the late Iraqi leader, with all of his film roles having him portraying Hussein.

Biography

Jerry Haleva, a Sephardic Jew, is a member of the Republican Party and has worked as a lobbyist for the American Israel Public Affairs Committee, among others. In 1973, he was an adviser to a legislative committee investigating prison conditions in California. He served in the California Senate in 1977 as chief of staff for William Campbell.

In 1989, a colleague of Haleva distributed a photo of the then-Iraqi leader Saddam Hussein among his co-workers with the text "Now we know what Haleva does on his weekends". A few years later, Haleva contacted Ron Smith, who represented doppelgängers in the film industry, and Smith had a small role for Haleva in the feature film Hot Shots! (1991), followed by a more prominent role in its sequel, Hot Shots! Part Deux (1993). Haleva played Hussein in half a dozen films. Besides the Hot Shots! movies and The Big Lebowski, he appeared in a few other films and also appeared in commercials (including for Nintendo).

In the spring of 2003, when Iraq was invaded, he decided to stop working as Hussein's doppelgänger. In January 2004 he came back to this decision and said in an interview that he was interested in continuing his acting career.

As of 2016, he was a contract lobbyist (Sergeant Major Associates) and lived in Sacramento, California.

Filmography

References

External links
 

Living people
20th-century American male actors
American actor-politicians
American impressionists (entertainers)
American lobbyists
American male film actors
American Sephardic Jews
California Republicans
Cultural depictions of Saddam Hussein
Male actors from California
Year of birth missing (living people)